The Adventures of Unemployed Man is a 2010 parody comic book created by Erich Origen and Gan Golan. The book was published on October 18, 2010, through Little, Brown & Company.

Origen and Golan stated that they came up with the idea of using the comic book as a medium as a "dose of emergency comic relief" and because they saw the idea of "ordinary people" dealing with large issues such as unemployment as "not that far" from the idea of superheroes battling large villains.

Synopsis
The book follows Unemployed Man, an out of work superhero and his sidekick Plan B. Unemployed Man first began as The Ultimatum, a rich superhero that looked down upon the poor and unemployed as lazy or otherwise unmotivated. He later loses his job and is defeated by the Invisible Hand, eventually ending up homeless. Unemployed Man must then seek a new job and team up with other superheroes in the same situation he is currently in.

Reception
The book was reviewed in Wired and Time. The Guardian called it "a furious, fearless, Swiftian kind of a book". Publishers Weekly stated that the "entire message comes off as preaching to the choir".

References

External links
 

2010 graphic novels
2010 comics debuts
Fictional unemployed people
Parody comics
Parody superheroes
Satirical comics